Timmie is a given name. Notable people with the name include:

Timmie Jean Lindsey (born 1932), first silicon brest implant recipient
Timmie Rogers (1915–2006), American comedian, singer-songwriter, actor
Timmie Ware (born 1963), American football player

See also
Timme, given name and surname
Timmy, given name